Zhang Mengqi (born 10 October 1989) is a Chinese footballer who currently plays for Zibo Cuju.

Club career
Zhang Mengqi joined Genbao Football Academy in 2000 and graduated to China League Two side Shanghai East Asia's first team at the beginning of the 2006 league season. He moved to Shanghai Shenhua's youth academy in 2007 and returned to Shanghai East Asia in 2008 for the 2008 China League One season. He scored his first senior goal on 15 November 2008 in a 2–1 away loss against Wuxi Zobon. He scored his second goal on 29 August 2009 in a 6–1 home victory against Sichuan F.C.

Zhang transferred to fellow League One side Shanghai Zobon in December 2009. He was linked with Shanghai East Asia and Chongqing Lifan at the end of 2010 season. He failed to pass the trial and joined China League Two side Hubei CTGU Kangtian in March 2011. Zhang transferred to another League Two club Hubei China-Kyle in 2012 and followed the club promote to the second tier in the 2012 season.

Zhang transferred to China League Two side Guizhou Zhicheng in 2014. He was the key player of Guizhou to win promotion to China League One in 2014 season and promotion to Chinese Super League in 2016 season. He extended his contract with the club on 14 January 2017. On 11 March 2017, Zhang made his Super League debut in a 1–1 home draw against Beijing Guoan.

Career statistics
.

References

External links
 

1989 births
Living people
Chinese footballers
Footballers from Shanghai
Association football midfielders
Chinese Super League players
China League One players
China League Two players
Shanghai Port F.C. players
Pudong Zobon players
Xinjiang Tianshan Leopard F.C. players
Guizhou F.C. players